2000 Years of Human Error is the fourth studio album by the American rock band Godhead. It was released on January 23, 2001 by Posthuman Records, making this one of Posthuman's only releases. The album contains select songs that have been re-recorded by the band, which previously appeared on 1998's Power Tool Stigmata. "Sinking" has since been re-recorded for the subsequent release Unplugged. The version of "Penetrate" featured on this album was also featured on the soundtrack to the 2002 movie Queen of the Damned.

2000 Years of Human Error spawned two singles, "The Reckoning" and the Beatles cover "Eleanor Rigby". It also had a music video largely consisting of vocalist Jason C. Miller singing and walking down a street in slow motion as other band members are seen sitting or standing along the sidewalk in a depressed manner.

The album, considered Godhead's breakthrough, has sold over 100,000 copies to date in the United States. Its success earned them recognition by Ozzy Osbourne and landed them a spot on the second stage of Ozzfest 2001. 2000 Years of Human Error features additional contributions by Marilyn Manson bassist Twiggy Ramirez, Scott Putesky (original guitarist for Marilyn Manson, formerly known as Daisy Berkowitz), as well as Manson himself.

Track listing

Personnel
 Jason C. Miller – vocals, rhythm guitar, mixing
 Mike Miller – lead guitar, backing vocals
 Ullrich "Method" Hepperlin – bass, programming
 James O'Connor – drums
 Marilyn Manson – vocals (track 6), producer
 Twiggy Ramirez – bass, guitar (tracks 2, 6, 10)
 Reeves Gabrels – guitar, synthesizer (track 5)
 Danny Saber – guitar (track 10), harmonica (track 6), producer, programming, engineering, keyboards
 Stacy Plunk – additional vocals (tracks 1, 9)
 Paul Muniz – vocoder (track 10)
 Doug Milton – editing
 Jeffrey Lesser – mixing, engineering
 John X Volaitis – producer (track 5), mixing
 Eddy Schreyer – mastering
 Jesse Gorman – engineering
 P.R. Brown – cover art, artwork
 Glen Laferman – photography
 Ciulla Management, Inc. – management

In video games
The song "Inside You" was used in the PlayStation 2 game, Shaun Palmer's Pro Snowboarder.

Chart performance

References

External links

2001 albums
Godhead (band) albums
Priority Records albums
Posthuman Records albums
Albums produced by Danny Saber
Albums produced by Marilyn Manson